John Harcourt "Jackie" du Preez (14 November 1942 – 8 April 2020)  was a Rhodesian cricketer who played in two Test matches for South Africa against Australia in 1967.

A leg-spinner and useful lower-order batsman, he was educated at Prince Edward School and first played for Rhodesia aged 18 against New Zealand in Bulawayo in October, 1961. He represented Rhodesia a record 112 times before retiring in 1979.

Later he served as a national selector for Zimbabwe. Du Preez died on 8 April 2020 in Harare after suffering from a long-standing heart condition. He was 77.

References

External links

 Rhodesian sport profiles: Jackie du Preez

1942 births
2020 deaths
Afrikaner people
Alumni of Prince Edward School
Cricketers from Harare
Rhodesia cricketers
South Africa Test cricketers
South African cricketers
White Rhodesian people
White Zimbabwean sportspeople